Ashes to Gold is a book by Sherry Andrews and Patti Roberts, former wife of Richard Roberts, and daughter in law of faith healer Oral Roberts. The book offers a critical assessment of the Roberts' ministry and university. In a 1987 review Martin Gardner concluded Patti left Richard because of "her distress in watching Richard turn into a clone of Oral, and shameless way that she and Richard rationalized their jet-set way of life." Patti's "painful memoir" is cited as a scholarly source on Roberts and his ministry." The book has been reportedly banned from Oral Roberts University.

References

1987 non-fiction books
Books about Christianity
American biographies